Sverkersson is a surname. Notable people with the surname include:

Burislev Sverkersson or Boleslaw of Sweden, son of Sverker the Elder, King of Sweden and his second wife Richeza of Poland
Johan I Sverkersson or John I of Sweden (1201–1222), Swedish king elected in 1216
Karl Sverkersson or Charles VII of Sweden (1130–1167), ruler of Gothenland, and then King of Sweden from circa 1161 to 1167
Sune Sik Sverkersson or Sune Sik (born 1154), allegedly a Swedish prince

See also
Sverkerson
Sverrisson